

This is a list of the National Register of Historic Places listings in Jefferson County, Ohio.

This is intended to be a complete list of the properties on the National Register of Historic Places in Jefferson County, Ohio, United States.  The locations of National Register properties for which the latitude and longitude coordinates are included below, may be seen in a Google map.

There are 25 properties and districts listed on the National Register in the county, including two National Historic Landmarks.  Another two properties were once listed but have been removed.

Current listings

|}

Former listings

|}

See also

 List of National Historic Landmarks in Ohio
 Listings in neighboring counties: Belmont, Brooke (WV), Carroll, Columbiana, Hancock (WV), Harrison, Ohio (WV)
 National Register of Historic Places listings in Ohio

References

 
Jefferson